Swingin' Utters (often typeset as $wingin' Utter$, and originally called Johnny Peebucks and the Swingin' Utters) is a Californian punk rock band that formed in the late 1980s. After a seven-year hiatus, the band reformed in 2010 and have since released four more records.

History
Johnny Peebucks and the Swingin' Utters began in Santa Cruz, California, later moving to San Francisco. The early lineup comprised singer Johnny "Peebucks" Bonnel, guitarist/accordionist Darius Koski, bassist Kevin Wickersham, and drummer Greg McEntee. The band changed its name to The Swingin' Utters in 1994.

The band's 1995 album The Streets of San Francisco won them 'Best Debut Album' at the Bay Area Music Awards, and they were included on the first Vans Warped Tour.

They have been signed to Fat Wreck Chords since 1996, releasing A Juvenile Product of the Working Class that year and releasing five further albums on the label since.

While Johnny Bonnel is the lead singer of the group, lead guitarist Darius Koski provides lead vocals on many of the band's tracks. Spike Slawson, Max Huber and Jack Dalrymple have also provided lead vocals on occasion.

The band toured the US with The Damned and Dropkick Murphys in the early 2000s. They also toured Europe with Rancid.

The band's track "The Lonely" was included in the Association for Independent Music (AFIM) Indie Award-winning soundtrack of the 2001 film That Darn Punk.

In 2010 a tribute album for the band, Untitled 21: A Juvenile Tribute to the Swingin' Utters, was released. After a seven-year hiatus, the band returned in 2010 with the Brand New Lungs EP, and followed it with the album Here, Under Protest in 2011.

The band finished their second full-length since their return, Poorly Formed, which was released in early 2013.  Longtime bassist Spike Slawson has left the band and is replaced by Miles Peck.

In April 2013, the band toured Australia with Dropkick Murphys and Frank Turner. Most recently the band has released their latest album "Fistful of Hollow" which was released in 2014. It is also the last album to see original member and longtime drummer Greg McEntee who has recently left the band in mid 2015. He was then replaced by Luke Ray. This exit leaves Johnny Bonnel as the only original member left in the band.

Swingin' Utters is currently on tour to support the celebration of the Fat Wreck Chords 25th Anniversary.

Musical style
The band's sound is a traditional punk rock sound, and has been described as "street punk". CMJ New Music Report described their sound as "blue-collar pop-influenced punk". Comparisons have been drawn with early punk bands such as The Clash, Sham 69, The Sex Pistols, and Stiff Little Fingers. The band have also incorporated elements of country music and roots rock, with comparisons to band such as Dropkick Murphys and The Pogues. Bonnel cites early punk rock bands and Celtic music as his early influences. Darius Koski said of their music "I've always thought of [our] songs as just loud, aggressive and fast folk or country songs."

Side projects
Members of the Swingin' Utters have been involved in many musical side projects, most notably Johnny Bonnel, Darius Koski, and Spike Slawson's Filthy Thievin' Bastards (formed in 2000). Druglords of the Avenues with Johnny Peebucks singing (formed in Oakland, California in 2004), and Spike Slawson's Me First and the Gimme Gimmes (in which he is the vocalist).

Drummer Greg McEntee also joined Viva Hate in February 2007, and the Re-Volts are fronted by Spike Slawson, with Darius Koski and Jack Dalrymple on guitar for their first record. Dalrymple was the former vocalist/guitarist for fellow Fat Wreck band Dead to Me as well. Jack also sings and plays guitar in 2 bands that are on Adeline Records, first is the band One Man Army which recently reunited after almost a decade of hiatus and released a new EP.  The 2nd is a brand new band named ToyGuitar which Jack is joined by Miles Peck on guitar as well.  Miles is also the lead singer and guitarist in bay area punk band The Sore Thumbs.

Band members
Current members
 Johnny "Peebucks" Bonnel - lead vocals (1987–present)
 Darius Koski - guitars, vocals, accordion (1989–present)
 Jack Dalrymple - guitar, vocals (2006–present)
 Luke Ray - drums (2015–present)
 Tony Teixeira - bass (2017–present)

Former members
 Aric McKenna - guitar (1987–1989)
 Greg McEntee - drums (1987–2015)
 Joel Dison - guitar (1989–1992)
 Max Huber - guitar, vocals (1992–2002)
 Kevin Wickersham - bass (1987–1997)
 Spike Slawson - bass, vocals (1997–2012)
 Miles Peck - bass, vocals (2012–2017)

 Timeline

Discography

Studio albums
 Scared - 1992
 The Streets of San Francisco - 1995
 A Juvenile Product of the Working Class - 1996
 Five Lessons Learned - 1998
 Swingin' Utters - 2000 - CMJ No. 50
 Dead Flowers, Bottles, Bluegrass, and Bones - 2003
 Here, Under Protest - 2011
 Poorly Formed - 2013
 Fistful Of Hollow - 2014
 Peace and Love - 2018

Compilations
 More Scared: The House of Faith Years - 1996
 Hatest Grits: B-Sides And Bullshit - 2008
 Drowning in the Sea, Rising with the Sun - 2017

Live albums/EPs
 Live at the Fireside Bowl EP - 1996
 Live in a Dive - 2004

Singles/EPs
 Gives You Strength EP - 1992
 No Eager Men - 1993
 Nothing To Rely On - 1995
 The Sounds Wrong EP - 1995
 I Need Feedback - 1998
 Brazen Head E.P. - 1999
 Teen Idol Eyes - 1999
 "Fat Club" - 2001
 Brand New Lungs - 2010
 "Taking The Long Way" - 2010
 The Librarians Are Hiding Something - 2012
 Stuck in a Circle - 2013

Splits
 Swingin' Utters/Slip (split single with Slip) - 1994
 Swingin' Utters/UK Subs (split with UK Subs) - 1995
 Bombing the Bay (split with AFI) - 1997
 BYO Split Series Volume II (split with Youth Brigade) - 1999
 Der Glorreiche 7" Klub#4 (split with Wham Bam Bodyslam) - 2012
 Swingin' Utters/Modern Action (split single) (Modern Action Records 2013)

Compilation appearances
 "Five Lessons Learned"- Tony Hawk's Pro Skater 2
 "Stupid Lullabies" - Dave Mirra Freestyle BMX
 "Eddie's Teddy" - The Rocky Horror Punk Rock Show
 "The Lonely" - That Darn Punk
 "Dirty sea"- Keep the Beat, Hairball 8 records - 1996
 "Reggae Gets Big In A Small Town" - Mighty Attack - 1999
 "Teenage Genocide" - Hardcore Breakout USA 1,2,3,... - 2004
 "Not Your Savior" - The Songs of Tony Sly: A Tribute - 2013

DVD
 Live at the Bottom of the Hill (2003)

References

External links
 
 [ Swingin' Utters at AllMusic]

Fat Wreck Chords artists
Punk rock groups from California
Musical groups established in 1988
SideOneDummy Records artists